Crisilla semistriata is a species of minute sea snail, a marine gastropod mollusk or micromollusk in the family Rissoidae.

References

 Little, C.; Morritt, D.; Seaward, D.R.; Williams, G.A. (1989). Distribution of intertidal molluscs in lagoonal shingle (The Fleet, Dorset, U.K.). J. Conch., Lond. 33: 225-232

Rissoidae
Gastropods described in 1808